Guhua is a genus of African long-legged cave spiders containing the single species, Guhua kakamegaensis. It was  first described by H. F. Zhao & S. Q. Li in 2017, and is only found in Kenya.

References

External links

Endemic fauna of Kenya
Monotypic Araneomorphae genera
Telemidae